Vertefeuille is a surname. Notable people with the surname include:

Christine S. Vertefeuille (born 1950), American lawyer and judge
Fabien Vanasse dit Vertefeuille (1850–1936), Canadian journalist, lawyer and politician
Jeanne Vertefeuille (1932–2012), CIA employee who investigated Cold War spy Aldrich Ames

See also
Francois Vertefeuille House, historic house in Wisconsin, United States